Myllocerus delicatulus, is a species of weevil found in India and Sri Lanka.

Description
This species has a body length is about 2.5 to 3.5 mm. Body piceous, with uniform light yellowish-green scales. Heacl subconical. Eyes dorsal. Forehead not impressed. Antennae flavescent. Prothorax transverse, and subcylindrical. Elytra, with less strongly rounded bases. Legs flavescent. and the femora with a single small tooth.

It is a known pest of Litchi chinensis and Moringa oleifera.

References 

Curculionidae
Insects of Sri Lanka
Beetles described in 1871